Potanthus is a large genus of skipper butterflies. They are commonly known as darts. They are found from South Asia to East Asia, and down to maritime Southeast Asia (though not extending towards New Guinea). It includes about 35 species, all of which look very similar to each other and are often only reliably identifiable through the examination of the male genitalia.

Potanthus species are sun-loving diurnal flyers. They are usually found in primary and secondary forests, as well as in partly cleared areas, grasslands, and near small villages. Occasionally they may be found in swamps and mangrove forests. The larvae feed on Bambusa (bamboo) and Dendrocalamus (both Gramineae). It includes the following species:

Potanthus amor Evans, 1932 - Timor, Sumba, and Oinanaisa
Potanthus chloe Eliot, 1960 - endemic to Malaysia
Potanthus confucius (Chinese dart or Confucian dart)
Potanthus dara (Kollar, 1845) - Himalayas, Indo-China, Malaysia
Potanthus diffusus Hsu, Tsukiyama & Chiba, 2005 - endemic to Taiwan
Potanthus fettingi (Möschler, 1878) - Sundaland, Sulawesi, and the Philippines
Potanthus flavus (Murray, 1875) - Amur to Japan, China, the Philippines, and Thailand
Potanthus juno (Evans, 1932) - Assam to the Malay Peninsula, Zhejiang
Potanthus ganda (Fruhstorfer, 1911) - Assam, Indochina, southern China, Sundaland, and Calamian, Palawan
Potanthus hetaerus (Mabille, 1883) - the Philippines, and Sulawesi
Potanthus ilion (de Nicéville, 1897) - endemic to Lombok
Potanthus lydia (Evans, 1934) - western China to the Malay Peninsula
Potanthus mara (Evans, 1932) (Sikkim dart) - endemic to Tibet
Potanthus motzui Hsu, Li & Li, 1990 - endemic to Taiwan
Potanthus mingo (Edwards, 1866) - the Philippines, Java, Assam, Burma, Indochina, and Yunnan
Potanthus miyashitai Fujioka & Tsukiyama, 1975
Potanthus nesta (Evans, 1934) - Yunnan and Sichuan, China
Potanthus niobe (Evans, 1934) - endemic to the Philippines
Potanthus omaha (Edwards, 1863) - Burma to Indochina, Tawi-Tawi and Mindanao in the Philippines, Sulawesi and Sumbawa
Potanthus pallida (Evans, 1932) (pallid dart) - Sri Lanka, India, southern China, and southern Thailand
Potanthus palnia (Evans, 1914) (Palni dart) - the Palni Hills of southern India, Burma to Sumatra, southeastern Tibet and China
Potanthus pamela (Evans, 1934) 
Potanthus parvus Johnson & Johnson, 1980 
Potanthus pava (Fruhstorfer, 1911) (Pava dart) - Taiwan, India, Indochina, Malay Peninsula, Philippines, and Sulawesi
Potanthus pseudomaesa (Moore, 1882)(Indian dart) - lower Himalayas, India, Sri Lanka, Yunnan
Potanthus rectifasciata (Elwes & Edwards, 1897) (branded dart) - Sikkim to the Malay Peninsula, Yunnan
Potanthus riefenstahli Huang, 2003 - Yunnan
Potanthus serina Plötz, 1883) (large dart) - Burma to Indochina, the Philippines
Potanthus sita (Evans, 1932)
Potanthus taqini Huang, 2001 - endemic to Tibet
Potanthus tibetana Huang, 2002 - Tibet and Yunnan
Potanthus trachala (Mabille, 1878) - India, Indochina, Malaysia, and southern China
Potanthus upadhana (Fruhstorfer, 1911) - Java, Lombok
Potanthus wilemanni (Evans, 1934)  - Taiwan
Potanthus yani Huang, 2002  - China

Gallery

References

External links
Images representing Potanthus  at  Consortium for the Barcode of Life
Images representing Potanthus at Encyclopedia of Life

 
Hesperiidae genera